Tirath Singh Thakur (born 4 January 1952 at Pogal Ramban) is an Indian jurist who served as the 43rd Chief Justice of India (CJI) from 3 December 2015 to 4 January  2017. Before being elevated to the Supreme Court, he served as the Chief Justice of Punjab and Haryana High Court from August 2008 to November 2009 .He has also served as a senior judge in Karnataka High Court from March 1994 to July 2004 and Jammu and Kashmir High Court from February to March 1994.

Early life and education 
Thakur graduated from Govt. Gandhi Memorial Science College and completed law from Department  of Law Jammu University.

Career 
Tirath Singh Thakur enrolled as a pleader in October 1972 and joined the chamber of his father Late Shri Devi Das Thakur, former governor of Assam a leading advocate and later, a judge of High Court of J & K. Justice T. S. Thakur practised in civil, criminal, constitutional, taxation and service matters in the High Court of Jammu & Kashmir.

He was designated as a senior advocate in 1990. He was appointed an additional judge of the High Court of J & K on 16 February 1994 and transferred as judge of the High Court of Karnataka in March 1994. He was appointed a permanent judge in September 1995. He was transferred as a judge of the High Court of Delhi in July 2004. 

He was appointed acting chief justice of the Delhi High Court on 9 April 2008 and took over as the chief justice of the High Court of Punjab and Haryana on 11 August 2008. He was elevated as a judge of the Supreme Court and assumed charge on 17 November 2009.

Chief Justice of India

He was appointed Chief Justice of India on 18 November 2015 assuming office on 3 December 2015, succeeding Justice H. L. Dattu who retired as CJI on 2 December 2015, on turning 65 years of age. He was sworn in by President Pranab Mukherjee. He retired on 4 January 2017 after reaching age 65.

In April 2016, he lamented the inaction by the government in increasing the number of judges.

References 

1952 births
Living people
20th-century Indian judges
20th-century Indian lawyers
21st-century Indian judges
21st-century Indian lawyers
Chief justices of India
Chief Justices of the Punjab and Haryana High Court
Judges of the Delhi High Court
Justices of the Supreme Court of India